The Virginia Monument is a Battle of Gettysburg memorial to the commonwealth's "Sons at Gettysburg" (Battlefield) with a bronze statue of Robert E. Lee on his horse Traveller and a "bronze group of figures representing the Artillery, Infantry, and Cavalry of the Confederate Army".    The equestrian statue is atop a granite pedestal and the group of six standing figures is on a sculptured bronze base with the figures facing the Field of Pickett's Charge and the equestrian statue of Union General George G. Meade on Cemetery Ridge.

History
The granite pedestal without either sculpture was dedicated on June 30 for the 1913 Gettysburg reunion.  On June 8, 1917, Virginia governor Henry C. Stuart presented the completed memorial to the Assistant Secretary of War.

See also
List of monuments of the Gettysburg Battlefield

References

Gettysburg Battlefield monuments and memorials
1917 sculptures
M
Bronze sculptures in Pennsylvania
Equestrian statues in Pennsylvania
Confederate States of America monuments and memorials in Pennsylvania
Statues of Robert E. Lee
1917 establishments in Pennsylvania